"Dream-A-Lot's Theme (I Will Live for Love)" is a song recorded by Donna Summer in 2003.

The song was not released as a commercial single. It was included as one of three new tracks on Universal's greatest hits package The Journey: The Very Best of Donna Summer and released as a 12" promo single to club DJs. "Dream-A-Lot's Theme" reached #20 on the US Club Play Chart in 2004.

In 2005 the track was included on a second Universal compilation, Gold.

Charts

Donna Summer songs
2003 songs
2004 singles
Songs written by Donna Summer
Song recordings produced by Giorgio Moroder